Dougal Shelton McNeill is a New Zealand academic and as of 2021 is a senior lecturer in the English Department at the Victoria University of Wellington.

Academic career

After a 2008 PhD titled Forecasts of the past: globalisation, history and contemporary realism at the University of Melbourne, McNeill worked at  Sophia University, Tokyo Woman's Christian University and the University of Melbourne. before  moving to the Victoria University of Wellington, rising to senior lecturer.

In 2015, he called a visit to Victoria University of Wellington by Israeli soldiers "a propaganda project".

McNeill is involved in the Tertiary Education Union.

Books 
McNeill's books include:

British Literature in Transition, 1920–1940: Futility and Anarchy (edited with Charles Ferrall, Cambridge University Press, 2018)

References

External links
 
 

Living people
1981 births
University of Melbourne alumni
Academic staff of Sophia University
Academic staff of the University of Melbourne
Victoria University of Wellington alumni
Academic staff of the Victoria University of Wellington